This is a list of constituencies in the "historical" country of Essex

Seats before 1832: 8 seats

Seats 1832 - 1868: 10 seats

Seats 1868 - 1885: 12 seats

Seats 1885 - 1918: 13 seats

See also
List of former parliamentary constituencies in Essex
List of parliamentary constituencies in Essex